
Australian handball is a sport in which players hit a ball against one or more walls.

Play

Australian handball is similar to squash played without a racquet. The ball is served such that it makes direct contact with the front wall without having bounced on the ground. It must then be returned similarly by the opponent to the front wall before the ball bounces on the ground twice.  It may also contact side walls to or from the front wall, but once a player has struck the ball with hand, it must make contact with the front before touching the ground.

The game is played in singles or doubles format. There are 1, 3 or 4 wall versions of this game. The typical Australian version is the three wall version, as most courts in Australia are set for this version. Perhaps the bulk of these playing venues are set in various private Catholic Colleges.

History and development
Australian handball is similar to Gaelic, Welsh and American handball, and has been played formally in Australia, since 1923.

Introduction
Although its formal beginnings in Australia date from 1923, it has been played in some capacity or another since the 19th century.

A similar game was introduced from Ireland and the first Australian Handball court was built by Melbourne hotel-keeper, Michael Lynch, in 1847.

Schoolboys
Its early development has been attributed to the work of Christian Brothers' Colleges.

Handball was very strongly promoted among the students at Christian Brothers' Colleges, driven by the Brothers' view that handball "affords an excellent preparatory training for football, as it calls into play all the resources of the physical man", and is one of the best ways for a potential Australian Rules footballer to acquire the optimum level of hand–eye coordination, ambidexterity, smoothness and flexibility, and sense of where one is in time and space (e.g., Bill Serong who played in three Grand Finals for Collingwood, went to the Christian Brothers' College in Victoria Parade, and was the Australian handball champion in 1974, aged 38).

National competition
Over most of its history, its primary play has been in Victoria, South Australia and New South Wales. As the game continued to develop, by 1970, there were about 1,000 players registered within the New South Wales, Victorian and South Australian state associations.

For many decades, the Australian Handball Council has held almost annual national championships, and each state has held its own state titles. Senior titles have not been the only level of keen interest and activity, however.  During the 1950s' and 1960s, both – the Australian Singles Schoolboys Handball Championships and the Australian Doubles Schoolboys Handball Championships – were held on regular bases.  Many great champions of the past were 'blooded' on these schoolboy rivalries. Additionally, over many decades Australians have made regular appearances at the World Junior and World Senior Titles. Within Australia, of more recent decades, the chief rivalries have been between Victoria and South Australia. For the past three decades, the states have generally engaged in some 'midpoint' venue – usually in Warrnambool, Victoria, over one weekend annually, for the national handball championships. In some areas, modern changes to school venues have meant the disappearance of the school's traditional handball courts, making it harder on handballers to access the game.

The game is nationally run by the Australian Handball Council, formed in 1928, of which the current Executive Director is Jim Kiley, and the Secretary/Treasurer – Greg Hay.

Notable players
A few highly respected names in the game's history include multi-national champions, James Martin "Jim" Flattery, Tim Tucker, and George Macris in the first half of the 20th century, and John Hughes of Victoria, Paul Fallon of NSW , Lou Ravesi of SA, and Vic DeLuzio and Geoff Walsh of Victoria, in the 2nd half.

See also
 Downball, a similar game, in which the ball is directed firstly into the ground (then the wall), rather than being directed directly at the wall as in Australian Handball.  
 Hack Slap, an analogous game played with the feet instead of hands.
 Handball (school), a popular game played in schools in Australia — a schoolyard variant of Four square.

References

External links

Wallball Australia
Wallball Australia- Facebook page
World Handball Council

 
Children's games
Street games
Wall and ball games
Sports originating in Australia
Ball games
Australian games